is a Japanese professional shogi player ranked 7-dan.

Promotion history
Kobayashi's promotion history is as follows:
 6-kyū: 1990
 1-dan: 1993
 4-dan: April 1, 1997
 5-dan: April 1, 2001
 6-dan: April 5, 2006
 7-dan: October 12, 2011

References

External links
ShogiHub: Professional Player Info · Kobayashi, Hiroshi

1976 births
Japanese shogi players
Living people
Professional shogi players
Professional shogi players from Kyoto Prefecture